Margaret Gibson (born 1944 in Philadelphia, Pennsylvania) is an American poet.

Life
Margaret Gibson grew up in Richmond, Virginia, and was educated at Hollins College, and the University of Virginia. She went to Yaddo in 1975.

Gibson is Professor Emerita at The University of Connecticut.

She was named to a three-year term as Poet Laureate of Connecticut in 2019.

Gibson was married to the late David McKain, poet and author. She lives in Preston, Connecticut.

Awards
The Vigil, A Poem in Four Voices, a Finalist for the National Book Award in 1993
 Memories of the Future, The Daybooks of Tina Modotti, co-winner of the Melville Cane Award of the Poetry Society of America in 1986-87
 Long Walks in the Afternoon, the 1982 Lamont Selection of the Academy of American Poets
 National Endowment for the Arts Grant
 Lila Wallace/Reader's Digest Fellowship
 Grants from the Connecticut Commission on the Arts
 "Earth Elegy," the title poem of New and Selected Poems, won The James Boatwright III Prize for Poetry
 "Archaeology" was awarded a Pushcart Prize in 2001

Works

Poetry Books
 Not Hearing the Wood Thrush, Louisiana State University Press, 2018. 
Broken Cup, Louisiana State University Press, 2014. 
Second Nature, Louisiana State University Press, 2010.

Memoir

Anthologies

References

External links
 "A Reading by Margaret Gibson", Blackbird Magazine, June 14, 2002

Hollins University alumni
University of Virginia alumni
University of Connecticut faculty
1944 births
Living people
Writers from Richmond, Virginia
Writers from Philadelphia
People from Preston, Connecticut
American women poets
Poets Laureate of Connecticut
American women academics
21st-century American women